JS Ashigara (DDG-178) is an Atago-class guided missile destroyer in the Japan Maritime Self-Defense Force (JMSDF). Ashigara was named for Mount Ashigara, and is the first Japanese ship to bear the prefix JS (Japanese Ship) instead of JDS (Japanese Defense Ship).

She was laid down by Mitsubishi Heavy Industries in Nagasaki, Nagasaki on April 6, 2005, launched on August 30, 2006; and was commissioned on 13 March 2008.

Service
This ship was one of several in the JMSDF fleet participating in disaster relief after the 2011 Tōhoku earthquake and tsunami.

In late April 2017, the Ashigara along with the JS Samidare joined the US Navy's Carrier Strike Group 1 as the Strike Group moved into position off the Korean peninsula in response to escalating tensions between North Korea and the United States over the DPRK's nuclear weapons program.

Ashigara and the  participated in the RIMPAC exercises in the waters around Hawaii on August 17-30, 2020.

Gallery

Notes

External links

http://www.globalsecurity.org/military/world/japan/7700ton.htm

Atago-class destroyers
2006 ships
Ships built by Mitsubishi Heavy Industries